Dolichonychia is a medical condition in which the nail beds of the fingers and toes are abnormally long and slender, specifically, a finger nail index of 1.30 or more, it is a common feature in people with connective tissue disorders, such as Ehlers–Danlos syndromes, Marfan syndrome, and hypohidrotic ectodermal dysplasia., it often appears alongside arachnodactyly and/or dolichostenomelia, which is the condition of having long and slender fingers and toes.

See also
 Arachnodactyly
 Dolichostenomelia
 Marfan syndrome
 Ehlers–Danlos syndromes

References

Diseases and disorders
Ehlers–Danlos syndrome